Tricholoma ustaloides is a species of mushroom in the large genus Tricholoma. It has a widespread distribution in Europe, where it is typically found in association with oak and beech trees.  Although generally considered inedible, it is consumed by some in Mexico.

Description
The overall shape of the cap is bell-like when young, later flattening to a more irregular convex shape in maturity, and often developing a lobed appearance. The margins of the caps are usually turned inwards. The gills are crowded together, adnate or emarginate in attachment to the stipe, and white or a light ochraceous yellow with dark brown stains when old or bruised. The flesh is white or cream, smelling strongly of meal, with a bitter taste.

Spores have a roughly spherical or ellipsoid shape, are hyaline, smooth, non-amyloid, and have dimensions of 5.5—7.0 x 4.5—5.5 µm. Basidia are 4-spored and cystidia are absent.

Habitat and distribution
This mycorrhizal species typically grows in small groups, and is often found near trees in the genera Quercus and Fagus.

Although relatively rare, it has a widespread distribution in Europe, limited by the presence of its preferred tree hosts. Its first recorded appearance in Mexico was 1984.

Edibility
Despite its inedible status by some sources, Tricholoma ustaloides is consumed by the inhabitants of Ajusco and Topilejo, communities near Mexico City.

See also
List of North American Tricholoma
List of Tricholoma species

References

ustaloides
Fungi described in 1954
Fungi of Europe
Fungi of Mexico
Fungi without expected TNC conservation status